Jarvis Landing (formerly, Mayhews Landing) is a former unincorporated community, now annexed to Newark in Alameda County, California. It lies at an elevation of 10 feet (3 m).

References

Neighborhoods in Newark, California